He's a Dragon or He is Dragon, also in English territories titled as I Am Dragon, and in Germany Dragon: Love is a Scary Tale, is a 2015 Russian 3D romantic fantasy adventure film written and directed by Indar Dzhendubaev and produced by Timur Bekmambetov's company Bazelevs. The two main roles are played by Maria Poezzhaeva and Matvey Lykov. The film is loosely based on Marina and Sergey Dyachenko's 1996 fantasy novel The Ritual.

The action takes place in a fictional fantasy world, which is a stylistic fusion of Medieval Russia with Scandinavian, Celtic and Eastern traditions. The plot is about Princess Miroslava (Poezzhaeva) being abducted by a dragon and carried away to its lair on a remote island, where she encounters a mysterious young man named Arman (Lykov).

The film was theatrically released in Russia by Bazelevs Distribution on December 3, 2015, in RealD 3D, followed by streaming on Netflix.
It was the highest-grossing Russian film at the international box office in 2016.

Plot 
In the Kievan Rus' of European epics, the people knew no happiness, only fear as a dreadful dragon has been terrorizing a local village and its people. In order to appease the dragon, the villagers use a ritual that sacrificed young maidens and they sing an ancient song to summon the dragon. The dragon abducts one of the maidens, but one brave knight traveled to an island where the dragon lived to rescue his love, but the time he got there, it was to late. The knight and dragon fought a fierce battle, but in the end, the knight emerged victorious and the dragon was defeated. The knight freed his people from fear, he became known as the dragon slayer for his reputation for killing the dragon and the dreaded ritual was transformed into a wedding ceremony.

Many years later, the young Princess Miroslava (Maria Poezzhaeva), Mira for short, is betrothed to Igor, who is the dragon slayers grandson. Her father and sister Yaroslava think she is immature because she still likes fairy tales and playing with toys. Mira is placed on a boat deck in her wedding finery to be sent across the water to her future husband, Igor, the same way they used for the ritual to appease the dragon years ago. As Igor pulls her boat toward him, his people sing the ancient ritual song at their wedding.

In the middle of the wedding, the dragon who was thought to have been dead captures Mira. She is held prisoner in a cave where Mira meets a strange creature and a young man who cannot remember his name. Mira believes he is another prisoner and calls him Arman (Matvey Lykov). Soon, she discovers that Arman is the dragon who abducted her. He lives in human form, holding back the inner beast, but sometimes turns into a dragon against his will. As a dragon, Arman is unable to control himself.

Arman shows Mira the island and a place for her to create a home. He tells her that male dragons had long lived on the island. He and his father have been living together as long as he remembered, as a dragon boy he had been allowed to choose whether to stay human or become a dragon. He chose to remain human until the dragon slayer killed his father. In his grief and rage, he became a dragon, gaining the knowledge of all dragons who had come before him. Realizing that dragons were truly monsters, Arman isolated himself on the island to prevent himself from killing humans. Sensing the uncontrollable transition to dragon form, he would go into the cave where the dragon could not escape and remain there until reverting to human form and almost had his dragon form under control. He abducted Mira because of the ritual song sung at her wedding by villagers believing dragons to be extinct. The song caught Arman off guard and he did not have time to hide in the cave before responding to the song's summons.

Arman wants to live as a man and crush his inner dragon because he is afraid of harming Mira. Mira talks with Arman and teaches him to live as a human. As they get to know one another, Arman and Mira fall in love although Mira is still afraid of the dragon.

The island is bewitched so that only those who are loved by someone on the island can find the way to it. Because Mira's feelings toward Igor change as she fell in love with Arman, Igor meanwhile, searches futilely in a fog.

Mira's fear of the dragon causes her to secretly prepare a boat in order to escape. Learning of her preparations, Arman despairs of ever being able to control the dragon and reveals to Mira the real reason why the dragons had brought maidens to the island. Dragons bring young girls to the island so they can burn them to death and from the ashes of each girl a new dragon was born, that is how Arman was born. Arman orders Mira to leave so that she will avoid this fate. But without Mira, Arman does not know how to continue living.

Mira returns home. While preparing again for her wedding with Igor, Mira realizes that she still loves Arman and cannot live without him. While on the boat, Mira sings the ritual song to call the dragon. Arman, meanwhile, is ending his life in order to make sure that there will be no more dragons and but changes into the dragon as he hears the song. He recaptures Mira and brings her to the island, intending to burn her. Mira does not show fear to the dragon and confesses her love for him. This allows Arman to finally control himself as a dragon.

Years later, Mira and Arman are living together on the island with their daughter. Mira flies on her dragon-husband, who is no longer dangerous to her, and they live happily ever after.

Cast

Production

Development
He's a Dragon was the feature film directorial debut of Indar Dzhendubaev. To the post of director he was invited by Timur Bekmambetov, who acted as the main producer of the film. Filming took place in the Black Sea.

According to the creators of the film, they have preserved much of the literary original, but at the same time brought new elements to the story.

The film, 85% of which consisted of computer graphics, was drawn with the help of Russian computers.

The posters for the film were created at a 16-hour photo shoot by the photographer Uldus Bakhtiozina. During shooting, only film cameras were used, and the resulting pictures were not subjected to any additional processing, which is an absolute rarity for posters of modern films.

Filming
Principal photography took place at the beginning that August 2014 in Bulgaria is the main scenes were shot on the Black Sea coast and in the picturesque Prohodna cave.

Then the crew will go to the Black Sea coast, in the town of Sinemorets. The Bulgarian stage of filming will end on September 26, 2014, in December 2014 the remaining scenes will be shot in Moscow, Russia.

In the Moscow Pavilions, the initial scenes were completed: the abduction of the main character, flying a dragon, scenes in his den and the finale.

Music
The score was composed by Simon Finley. Russian folk-rock band Melnitsa (ru) recorded a song for the film titled "Rite" (whose title and lyrics reference the novel "The Ritual", on which the film is based). It was, however, not included in the final film. Singer-songwriter Jenia Lubich contributed to the soundtrack with her song Колыбельная тишины (Lullaby of Silence), which plays over the end credits. A music video was released on December 7, 2015, and has over 5 million views on YouTube. The song later appeared on her 2016 studio album Снежно (Snowy).

Post-production
The film's special effects were worked by professionals from the CGF (ru) computer graphics studio, directed by Aleksandr Gorokhov, who had previously been involved in the production of such films.

Release
On November 24, 2015, in Moscow hosted the magnificent premiere took place at the cinema "Karo 11 October".
The film was released in the Russian Federation by Bazelevs Distribution on December 3, 2015, and the world premiere of December 4, 2015. The film was released in the United States by 4Digital Media on 6 June 2017.

Marketing
The first trailer was released in the United States in April 2017.

Reception

Box office
The film flopped at the Russian box office, collecting only $1.7 million (114 million rubles), and in view of rentals in other CIS countries – $1.8 million, which is significantly less than the film's budget of $18 million. It, however, had great success at the Chinese box office, grossing , making it the most successful film in China in the history of Russian cinema. It was the overall highest-grossing Russian film at the international box office in 2016.

Critical response
The film was met with mixed reviews. Such publications as Film.ru,  The Hollywood Reporter, Izvestia and Afisha, responded positively to the film. Boris Ivanov, film critic of Film.ru, stated: "From whatever angle you look at it, the Hollywood movie "Twilight" seems like an amateur performance in comparison to "I am Dragon". Even the computer effects in the Russian production are more convincing. From the point of view of the genre, this is an almost impeccable "feminine" romantic fantasy."

Dmitry  Ostashevsky, Russian film critic of  The Hollywood Reporter, stated: "The computer animation and 3D graphics are so good that you begin to regret that such a cool dragon (that is, by the way, recognised as the most technologically complex virtual character in the whole history of Russian cinema) was chosen for the genre of melodrama and not blockbuster."

Others, in particular Mir Fantastiki, Weburg, and Kino-Teatr, rated it as average. 
"Russian Gazette" defeated the film, calling it "unimaginably boring", and the script "delusional".

References

External links
 
 
 
 
 

2015 films
2010s Russian-language films
2010s romantic fantasy films
2010s fantasy adventure films
2010s monster movies
2015 3D films
2010s teen romance films
Russian romance films
Romantic fantasy films
Russian fantasy adventure films
Russian 3D films
Films about dragons
Films about curses
Films about shapeshifting
Films based on adaptations
Films based on Beauty and the Beast
Kievan Rus in fiction
Films based on Russian novels
Films based on fantasy novels
Films based on romance novels
Romantic epic films
Films shot in Bulgaria
Films shot in Moscow
Films shot in Russia
2010s teen fantasy films
Bazelevs Company films